The Expal C-3-A and C-3-B are round Spanish rubber modified polystyrene cased anti-tank blast mines . The mines differ only in minor detail. The mine is classified as a minimum metal mine, the only metal it contains being a 4.5 millimetre diameter zinc-plated steel spring. The mine is found in Angola, the Falkland Islands, and the Western Sahara. The mines are vulnerable to the plastic cases deteriorating in bright sunlight, resulting in a reduction in activation pressure.

Specifications
 Weight: 5.7 kg
 Explosive content: 5 kg of TNT/RDX/Aluminium (50/30/20)
 Diameter: 290 mm
 Height: 60 mm
 Operating pressure: 275 kg

References
  also,  and 

Anti-tank mines
Weapons of Spain